Menalo is a Bosnian and Croatian surname. Notable people with this surname include:
Leo Menalo (born 2002), Croatian basketball player
Luka Menalo (born 1996), Bosnian footballer
Pero Menalo (born 1989), Croatian footballer

See also
Manalo
Manolo

Bosnian surnames
Croatian surnames